Fast Talking is a 1984 Australian film written and directed by Ken Cameron. It starred Rod Zuanic and Steve Bisley and Tracy Mann

Production
Cameron had been a school teacher before he became a filmmaker and the script was based on his personal experiences:
I think I was playing around with an idea of a Ginger Meggs, Junior Ned Kelly, character who was in a state of flight and rebellion from, I suppose, his school as prison. It's a strange work in the sense that it's never really resolved, his story. He remains on the run at the end just as he was at the beginning. I guess that comes from 400 Blows. I think I was very influenced by 400 Blows, by Ken Loach's work. It was an amalgam of all those things. I think at that stage in my career I was trying to graft the things that had influenced me onto the things that I saw in my own world.
He wrote the first draft at a time when he did not think film Monkey Grip would get made. He put it off to make that movie then went back to it in 1982.

In order to cast the film, Cameron spent three months teaching drama classes in schools in western Sydney to find young actors. Rod Zuanic was discovered at a high school in Blacktown. Christopher Truswell was working as an apprentice printer when he responded to an advertisement on radio station. 2SM.

The movie was shot over six weeks at Balmain High School and in the suburb of Rozelle, New South Wales.

Release
Cameron hoped to follow the adventures of his lead character in other films similar to that of Antoine Doinel in the movies of François Truffaut but Fast Talking was not sufficiently successful at the box office. However he did subsequently make another film about young people, Crime of the Decade, for the ABC, which he called an extension of his work for Fast Talking.

References

External links
Fast Talking at IMDb
Fast Talking at Ozmovies

Australian drama films
Films directed by Ken Cameron
1980s English-language films